Crystal Peak is a 6,595-foot (2,010 meter) summit located in eastern Mount Rainier National Park, in Pierce County of Washington state. Access to the summit (which was a former fire lookout site) is via a hiking trail which branches off from the Crystal Lakes Trail. That trailhead starts along Highway 410, which traverses the western base of the mountain. Precipitation runoff from Crystal Peak drains into tributaries of the White River.

Climate
Crystal Peak is located in the marine west coast climate zone of western North America. Most weather fronts originate in the Pacific Ocean, and travel northeast toward the Cascade Mountains. As fronts approach, they are forced upward by the peaks of the Cascade Range (Orographic lift), causing them to drop their moisture in the form of rain or snowfall onto the Cascades. As a result, the west side of the Cascades experiences high precipitation, especially during the winter months in the form of snowfall. During winter months, weather is usually cloudy, but, due to high pressure systems over the Pacific Ocean that intensify during summer months, there is often little or no cloud cover during the summer. Because of maritime influence, snow tends to be wet and heavy, resulting in high avalanche danger. The months July through September offer the most favorable weather for viewing or climbing this peak.

Gallery

See also

 Geography of Washington (state)
 Geology of the Pacific Northwest

References

External links
 National Park Service web site: Mount Rainier National Park
 Washington Trails Association: Crystal Peak

Cascade Range
Mountains of Pierce County, Washington
Mountains of Washington (state)
North American 2000 m summits